The second cycle of Holland's Next Top Model premiered on 12 March 2007 on RTL5. All of the previous season's judges returned for the new cycle, with the addition of former model and runway coach Mariana Verkerk as a new panel member. Stylist Hildo Groen  replaced makeup artist Dominique Samuel as a mentor for the contestants. This was the first cycle of the show to feature a live finale, with a combined vote from the public and the judges to determine the winner.

The prizes for this cycle included a modelling contract with Max Models valued at €50,000, an additional contract with Ice Models in South Africa, a cover feature for Glamour magazine, and a brand new Mercedes-Benz.

The winner of the competition was 21-year-old Kim Feenstra from Groningen.

Cast

Contestants
(Ages stated are at start of contest)

Judges
 Yfke Sturm (host)
 Rosalie van Breemen
 Carli Hermès
 Karin Swerink
 Mariana Verkerk

other cast members
Hildo Groen
Ruud van der Peijl

Episodes

Results

 The contestant was eliminated
 The contestant was immune from elimination
 The contestant won the competition

Final scores

Notes

References

Holland's Next Top Model
2007 Dutch television seasons